Kristy is a small village and municipality in the Sobrance District in the Košice Region of east Slovakia.

History
In historical records the village was first mentioned in 1333.

Geography
The village lies at an altitude of 108 metres and covers an area of 7.9 km2.
It has a population of about 300 people.

Culture
The village has a public library.

External links
 
https://web.archive.org/web/20070927203415/http://www.statistics.sk/mosmis/eng/run.html 
http://en.e-obce.sk/obec/kristy/kristy.html

Villages and municipalities in Sobrance District